Kim Clijsters and Rennae Stubbs won the title, defeating defending champions Cara Black and Martina Navratilova in the final, 6–3, 6–4.

Draw

Final

Group A

Group B

References
Ladies' Invitation Doubles

Ladies' Invitation Doubles